The 2008 NCAA National Collegiate Women's Ice Hockey Tournament involved eight schools playing in single-elimination play to determine the national champion of women's NCAA Division I college ice hockey. The quarterfinals were conducted at the homes of the seeded teams and the Frozen Four was conducted in Duluth, MN It began on March 14, 2009, and ended with the championship game on March 22. A total of seven games were played.

Bracket
Quarterfinals held at home sites of seeded teams

Note: * denotes overtime period(s)

References

NCAA Women's Ice Hockey Tournament
2008 in sports in Minnesota